National Route 486 is a national highway of Japan connecting between Sōja, Okayama and Higashihiroshima, Hiroshima in Japan. It has a total length of 130.8 km (81.27 mi).

References

486
Roads in Hiroshima Prefecture
Roads in Okayama Prefecture